Communal elections were held in Cambodia on Sunday, 4 June 2017. The National Election Committee (NEC) announced that some 7.8 million of 9.6 million eligible Cambodians were registered to cast their ballots. 94,595 candidates from 12 political parties contested the 11,572 commune council seats in 1,646 communes of Cambodia. Voter turnout was a record 90.37%. There were concerns surrounding some irregularities in the polling.

The result was a victory for the Cambodian People's Party, albeit with a smaller majority, and saw large gains by the Cambodia National Rescue Party. Ultimately, the strong showing by the opposition led to its dissolve before it could contest the national elections.

Results

References

Cambodia
2017 in Cambodia
Communal elections in Cambodia
June 2017 events in Asia